The 2021–22 afternoon network television schedule for the four major English-language commercial broadcast networks in the United States covers the weekday and weekend afternoon hours from September 2021 to August 2022. The schedule is followed by a list per network of returning and cancelled shows from the 2020–21 season.

Affiliates fill time periods not occupied by network programs with local or syndicated programming. PBS – which offers daytime programming through a children's program block, PBS Kids – is not included, as its member television stations have local flexibility over most of their schedules and broadcast times for network shows may vary. Also not included are MyNetworkTV and The CW (as the programming services also don't offer daytime programs of any kind), and Ion Television (as its schedule is composed mainly of syndicated reruns). Fox is not included on the weekday schedule: Fox only airs daytime programming (in the form of sports on weekend afternoons)

Effective this season, The CW turned over its weekday daytime hour to its affiliated stations on September 6, 2021; as such, The CW will not be listed in any afternoon network schedule articles from this season onward (unless it adds back afternoon programming in future seasons).

Legend

Schedule
New series are highlighted in bold.
All times correspond to U.S. Eastern and Pacific Time (select shows) scheduling (except for some live sports or events). Except where affiliates slot certain programs outside their network-dictated timeslots, subtract one hour for Central, Mountain, Pacific (for selected shows), Alaska, and Hawaii-Aleutian times.
Local schedules may differ, as affiliates have the option to pre-empt or delay network programs. Such scheduling may be limited to preemptions caused by local or national breaking news or weather coverage (which may force stations to tape delay certain programs in overnight timeslots or defer them to a co-operated station or digital subchannel in their regular timeslot) and any major sports events scheduled to air in a weekday timeslot (mainly during major holidays). Stations may air shows at other times at their preference.
All sporting events air live in all time zones in U.S. Eastern time, with local and/or primetime programming after game completion.

Weekdays

Notes:
 ABC stations have the option of airing General Hospital at 2:00 or 3:00 p.m. Eastern Time, depending on the station's choice of feed.
 Depending on their choice of feed, CBS stations have the option of airing Let's Make a Deal at either 10:00 a.m. or 3:00 p.m. Eastern (airtime adjusted by time zone), and/or The Young and the Restless at 11:00 or 11:30 a.m. local time (in the Central, Mountain, and Pacific time zones).
 NBC stations have the option of airing Days of Our Lives at varying airtimes (usually between Noon and 2:00 p.m. local time), depending on the station's preference and choice of feed.
 Fox aired Fox NFL Thursday on Thursdays at 7:30 p.m. ET live in all time zones during the fall.
ABC, CBS and/or NBC stations may air their corresponding network's early evening newscast anytime between 6:00- 8:00 p.m. ET and PT/5:00-7:00 p.m. CT/MT, depending on the station's choice of feed.

Saturday 

Notes:
 To comply with FCC educational programming regulations, stations may defer certain programs featured in their respective network's E/I program blocks to determined weekend late morning or afternoon time periods if a sporting event is not scheduled in the timeslot or in place of paid programming that would otherwise be scheduled.
 NBC Nightly News with Jose-Diaz Balart is preempted in the Eastern and Central Time zones when Notre Dame Football on NBC airs a 3:30 p.m. ET game, all other time zones air the program or sometimes may be preempted for other sporting events scheduled to air in the Afternoon (primetime in the Eastern and Central Time zones).
CBS Weekend News is preempted in the Eastern and Central time zones when SEC on CBS airs a 3:30 pm ET game, all other time zones air the program.
ABC, CBS and/or NBC stations may air their corresponding network's early evening newscast anytime between 6:00- 8:00 p.m. ET and PT/5:00-7:00 p.m. CT/MT, depending on the station's choice of feed.

Sunday

Notes:
 To comply with FCC educational programming regulations, stations may defer certain programs featured in their respective network's E/I program blocks to determined weekend late morning or afternoon time periods if a sporting event is not scheduled in the timeslot or in place of paid programming that would otherwise be scheduled.
 Airtimes of sporting events may vary depending on the offerings scheduled for that weekend. 
 When CBS and/or Fox offer an early singleheader NFL game, a post-game show airs after the game from 4:30–5:00 p.m. ET (the length of which may vary depending on the timing of the early game's conclusion) with local, syndicated or non-NFL sports programming airing after from 5:00–7:00 p.m. ET. Meanwhile, when CBS and/or Fox offer a late singleheader NFL game, local, syndicated or non-NFL sports programming airs from 1:00–4:00 p.m. ET/10:00 a.m.–1:00 p.m. PT.
 CBS and Fox stations in the Pacific Time Zone receiving an NFL singleheader game must air a late singleheader game, if possible.
 ABC, CBS and/or NBC stations may air their corresponding network's early evening newscast at 6:00 or 6:30 p.m. ET and PT/5:00 or 5:30 p.m. CT/MT, depending on the station's choice of feed.
 NBC Nightly News with Kate Snow airs live in all time zones during Fall to avoid pre-emption due to the live airing of NBC Sunday Night Football.
 ABC World News with Linsey Davis airs live in all time zones during Spring to avoid pre-emption due to the live airing of American Idol.
 CBS Weekend News is preempted on the Eastern and Central time zones when NFL on CBS airs late NFL Games, all other time zones air the program.

By network

ABC

Returning series:
ABC News
ABC World News Tonight
GMA3: What You Need To Know
ESPN on ABC
College Football Scoreboard
ESPN College Basketball on ABC
ESPN College Football on ABC
NBA Countdown
NBA Sunday Showcase
NHL on ABC 
WNBA on ABC
General Hospital
The View

CBS

Returning series:
The Bold and the Beautiful
CBS Evening News
CBS Sports
College Basketball on CBS
The NFL Today
NFL on CBS
PGA Tour on CBS
SEC on CBS/College Football on CBS
The Talk
The Young and the Restless

The CW

New series:
None, due to The CW's decision to air syndicated programming only

Not returning from 2020–21:
The Jerry Springer Show

Fox

Returning series:
Fox Sports
Fox College Football
Fox College Hoops
Fox NFL Sunday
NASCAR on Fox
NASCAR RaceDay

NBC

Returning series:
Days of Our Lives
NBC Nightly News
NBC Sports
Golf Channel on NBC
IndyCar on NBC
NASCAR America
NASCAR on NBC
Notre Dame Football on NBC
Premier League on NBC

Not returning from 2020–21:
 NBC Sports
 NHL on NBC

Renewals and cancellations

Series renewals

ABC
NHL on ABC—Renewed for a ninth season on March 10, 2021; deal will into a fourteenth season in 2027.

CBS
The Bold and the Beautiful—Renewed through the 2023–24 season on March 2, 2022.
College Basketball on CBS—Renewed through the 2022–23 season on July 24, 2017.
NFL on CBS—Renewed through the 2032–33 season on March 18, 2021.
SEC on CBS—Renewed for a twenty-seventh season; deal will conclude with its twenty-ninth season in 2023.
The Talk—Renewed for a thirteenth season on April 18, 2022.
The Young and the Restless—Renewed through the 2023–24 season on January 30, 2020.

Fox
Fox College Football—Renewed through the 2022–23 season on July 24, 2017.
Fox NFL Sunday—Renewed through the 2032–33 season on March 18, 2021.
NASCAR on Fox—Renewed through the 2023–24 season on August 2, 2013.

NBC
Days of Our Lives—Renewed through the 2022–23 season on May 11, 2021. On August 3, 2022, it was announced that the series would be moving to Peacock.

Notes

See also
2021–22 United States network television schedule (prime-time)
2021–22 United States network television schedule (morning)
2021–22 United States network television schedule (late night)
2021–22 United States network television schedule (overnight)

References

Sources
 
 
 

United States weekday network television schedules
2021 in American television
2022 in American television